Sarah Poyntell LaBudde Wolffe, Lady Wolffe is an American-born Scottish lawyer and judge who is currently a Professorship at the University of Strathclyde. She previously served as Senator of the College of Justice from 2014 to 2021. Wolffe was the first US-born member of the Scottish judiciary and the first woman appointed as a Commercial Judge in the Court of Session.

Early life 

Sarah Poyntell LaBudde was born in the United States, where she earned a Bachelor of Arts at Dartmouth College in Hanover, New Hampshire. In 1987, she moved to England and studied at Balliol College, Oxford. The same year, she met James Wolffe and they married. They both moved to Edinburgh, Scotland, and she studied at the University of Edinburgh, gaining an LLB in 1989 and a Diploma in Legal Practice the following year.

Early career 

Wolffe then qualified as a solicitor in 1992.  She became a member of the Faculty of Advocates in 1994. From 1996 to 2008 Wolffe was standing junior counsel to the Department of Trade and Industry and its successor departments. Since 2007 she acted as an ad hoc advocate depute. In 2008, she was appointed a Queen's Counsel.

Senator of the College of Justice

Nomination and appointment 

Wolffe became a member of the Outer House in March 2014.

Tenure 
In September 2021, Wolffe announced her intention to step down as judge in the Court of Session.

Academic career 

On 20 September 2021, Wolffe took up position of Professor of Practice at the University of Strathclyde's Law School, where she intends to teach civil justice and commercial law. She is also an Honorary Professor of the University of Edinburgh.

Personal life 

In 1987, she married James Wolffe KC, the Lord Advocate from 2016 to 2021. They have two sons.

References

Living people
Wolffe
Year of birth missing (living people)
Scottish solicitors
Scottish King's Counsel
21st-century King's Counsel
American emigrants to Scotland
Scottish women judges
21st-century Scottish judges
University School of Milwaukee alumni
21st-century women judges
Naturalised citizens of the United Kingdom